The radiotelephony message PAN-PAN is the international standard urgency signal that someone aboard a boat, ship, aircraft, or other vehicle uses to declare that they have a situation that is urgent, but for the time being, does not pose an immediate danger to anyone's life or to the vessel itself. This is referred to as a state of "urgency". This is distinct from a mayday call (distress signal), which means that there is imminent danger to life or to the continued viability of the vessel itself. Radioing "pan-pan" informs potential rescuers (including emergency services and other craft in the area) that an urgent problem exists, whereas "mayday" calls on them to drop all other activities and immediately begin a rescue.

The exact representation of PAN in Morse code is the urgency signal XXX, which was first defined by the International Radiotelegraph Convention of 1927.

Etymology

As with "mayday" (from venez m'aider, "come help me"), the urgency signal pan-pan derives from French. In French, a panne  is a breakdown, such as a mechanical failure.

A three-letter backronym, "possible assistance needed" or "pay attention now" derives from pan. Maritime and aeronautical radio communications courses use those as mnemonics to convey the important difference between mayday and pan-pan.

Usage
To declare pan-pan correctly, the caller repeats it three times: "Pan-pan, pan-pan, pan-pan," then states the intended recipient, either "all stations, all stations, all stations," or a specific station, e.g. "Victoria Coast Guard Radio, Victoria Coast Guard Radio, Victoria Coast Guard Radio." Then the caller states their craft's identification, position, nature of the problem, and the type of assistance or advice they require, if any. An equivalent Morse code signal was "X X X", with each letter sent distinctly.

Medical transports
The phrase "PAN-PAN MEDICAL" is reserved for medical transports. It is used to announce and identify medical transports.

Medical advice

One special case of "pan-pan" is to ask for medical advice. This is a normal "pan-pan" call that includes a phrase such as "request medical advice" and the craft identification, position, and nature of the medical problem. It should not be confused with the term "PAN-PAN MEDICAL" which is reserved for medical transports.

This type of call is specifically for getting a physician's advice for a medical problem that does not, in the opinion of the skipper or master of the vessel, seem life-threatening. The phrase "pan-pan medico" appears in some older reference books, but is not a correct usage.

Once patched through, a physician or other medical expert on land or in another vessel typically asks the radio operator to detail the symptoms and history of the condition, and provide any available patient medical history. The physician typically recommends first aid treatment and gives other advice based on what resources are available on board. In some cases, the medical issue may be urgent enough to escalate the pan-pan to a mayday call for immediate intervention by rescuers, if possible.

Nautical uses
Examples of the correct use of a "pan-pan" call from a boat or ship may include the following cases, provided the skipper or master remains confident they can handle the situation, and that there is no current danger to the life of any person or to the safety of the vessel. Once the urgent situation that led to the pan-pan broadcast is resolved or contended with, conventional practice is for the station that initiated the pan-pan call to make a followup broadcast to all stations, declaring that the urgent situation no longer exists.

A call that originates as a "pan-pan" signal might be followed by a Mayday distress signal if the situation deteriorates to the point of "grave and imminent danger," thus warranting immediate action (intervention, assistance, response) on the part of listeners in accordance with standard operating practices for distress signaling.

 Fouled propeller, engine failure or out of fuel Provided the vessel is now either anchored or under sail and safe from any immediate danger of collision or stranding. The crew may plan to clear the propeller, refuel from an onboard supply, hoist sail, or use alternative propulsion. Alternatively, as part of the pan-pan call, the skipper may request a tow from a suitable vessel, if possible, but without immediate urgency.
 Small fire on board – now extinguished Fire is dangerous afloat, but if it was small and contained, and is now certainly put out, and with no injury to people, then a "pan-pan" call is appropriate to warn others that investigations are underway to establish the extent of the damage, clear the smoke from below, and re-establish passage as soon as possible.
 Unsure of position Provided there is no apparent danger of stranding or hitting rocks, a pan-pan call on marine VHF radio may allow nearby coast-stations, and perhaps other vessels, to triangulate the source of the transmissions and provide a fix and perhaps offer advice on the best course to safety.
 Man-overboard recovery In a man overboard situation, a pan-pan call on VHF makes other nearby vessels aware of the situation and ensures that they keep a lookout, avoid coming too close, avoid excessive wake or otherwise interfering. It also alerts them that the recovery vessel is manoeuvring for urgent life-saving, and therefore may not manoeuvre in accordance with International Regulations for Preventing Collisions at Sea (COLREGS). In a more critical situationthe recovery vessel has lost sight of the person overboard, the person overboard is unconscious, there is a danger of hypothermia, or other grave risk to lifea mayday call is more appropriate, so that other nearby vessels can help rather than keep clear.
 Overdue vessel The Canadian and U.S. Coast Guards (and likely similar maritime safety agencies in other countries) issue "urgent marine information broadcasts" concerning vessels reported overdue, as part of the process of a 'communications search' or 'pre-com' phase of uncertain, possible distress, as determined under the authority of a maritime rescue co-ordination centre or joint maritime-aeronautical rescue co-ordination centre. The message content, a description of the vessel under the apprehension of being missing, its last known position, the date or time last heard from, and the supposed route or passage plan of the vessel, is preceded by the procedure words pan-pan and is addressed to "all stations." Any stations having information concerning the whereabouts of the named vessel are asked to communicate with and report same to the nearest coast guard station.
 Imminent collision alert A pan-pan call is warranted to attempt urgent radio contact with an approaching vessel that may be in danger or is approaching a dangerous close-quarters situation that would risk collision. This would be a 'bridge-to-bridge' communication, and could be combined with five or more short horn or whistle blasts, which is the "Your intentions are unclear or not understood" signal. A short blast is one second long, compared to a prolonged blast of four to six seconds under the COLREGS. An urgent warning could also be given over the radio, for example, if the called vessel appears unaware that it is at risk of striking a person in a small boat or a swimmer. A loud hailer could also be used along with a radio warning.
 Medical assistance Any immediate risk to life makes a "mayday" call more appropriate. If the vessel is heading to shore and wants an ambulance crew at the dock, the local Coast Guard station can arrange this. A physician or other trained medical advisor may also be available on the radio, perhaps by patching through via telephone from ashore or from a nearby vessel.  The UK Radiocommunications Authority at one time promulgated a "pan-pan medico" call for cases where someone needed medical help at sea. However, this was never an international procedure word and is not part of the ITU Radio Regulations or related international standards (e.g. International Maritime Organization or ICAO procedures).

Marine rescue organisations, such as Coastal Patrol, Coast Guard, and Search and Rescue listen on marine radio frequencies for all distress calls including "pan-pan". These organisations can coordinate or assist and can relay such calls to other stations that may be better able to do so.

Aeronautical uses

Aeronautical situations that require urgent assistance but do not pose an immediate threat to life include:
Becoming lost
A serious aircraft system failure, that requires an immediate route or altitude change
An engine failure in a multi-engine aircraft where the aircraft was still able to maintain height

Historical examples

In September 1998, Swissair Flight 111 used the call during an emergency landing request following a smoke event, which turned out to be an electrical fire that subsequently destroyed the aircraft.  Also, in the wake of Avianca Flight 52, the call is frequently used to denote situations where fuel is getting low for given conditions, but not yet at a critical emergency state. Qantas Flight QF-74 used the call "pan pan pan" when it had an engine failure on its fourth engine soon after take off from San Francisco. Qantas Flight 72 (QF-72) issued a pan-pan when the aircraft experienced rapid, uncommanded movements in which the plane dropped several hundred feet without instruction from the flight crew. Several passengers and crew suffered major and minor injuries, and so the call was upgraded to "mayday".

On 4 November 2010, Qantas Flight 32 issued a pan-pan when one of its four engines suffered an uncontained engine failure shortly after take-off in a flight from Singapore to Sydney.

On 15 December 2010, an RAF CH-47 Chinook helicopter with serial number ZH891 was on a daytime tasking in flight within the Green Zone in Kabul, Afghanistan when it came under small arms and rocket-propelled grenade fire. A 7.62-mm round penetrated the cockpit and hit the instrument panel, severing 36 wires leading to it from various instruments. The wiring loom was sheared as a result, which caused an instruments failure without damaging vital components. As the Chinook was still able to fly level, pilot Flight Lieutenant Alex "Frenchie" Duncan decided to issue a pan-pan rather than a mayday to Bastion Tower. The Chinook made it back to Camp Bastion safely without further incident.

On 13 April 2010, Cathay Pacific Airways flight CPA780 from Surabaya, Indonesia to Hong Kong issued a pan-pan when one of their engines failed. This was upgraded to a mayday when the second engine also quit shortly thereafter.

On 5 May 2012, Air Berlin Flight 9721, on an Airbus A330 with registration D-ALPA, issued a pan-pan 15 minutes before touchdown at Munich from Palma, Mallorca, when the crew reported fatigue to the traffic controllers and requested autoland. They in turn had to organize airspace for automatic landing 15 minutes later.

On 12 October 2013, Cyprus Airways flight number CY303 from Vienna to Larnaca, Cyprus, operated by an Airbus 319-100, registration number 5B-DCN, issued a pan-pan over Thessaloniki, Greece, due to a crack on the pilots' windscreen.  The pilots immediately descended to 23,000 feet to reduce pressure and the risk of the windscreen breaking. The pilots decided the best solution was to land at Eleftherios Venizelos airport in Athens, Greece, something they managed after 30 minutes of flight.

On 25 August 2014, an 82-year-old passenger aboard a chartered Australia by Air Beechcraft Duchess from Bankstown to Cowra, New South Wales, wrested controls from the pilot in an apparent attempt to cause a crash. After overpowering his passenger and regaining control, the pilot issued a pan-pan and performed a safe emergency landing.

In February 2016, Virgin Atlantic flight VS025 from London to New York City issued a pan-pan when west of Ireland, after the co-pilot reported feeling unwell due to an incident with a laser soon after take-off. The plane returned to Heathrow Airport as a "precautionary measure".

In March 2017, the crew of a Regional Express (Rex) flight ZL768, from Albury to Sydney, issued a pan-pan when one of the two propellers of the Saab 340 plane fell off over the Sydney suburb of Revesby. The aircraft was about 20 km from its destination, and it landed safely at Sydney Airport. The passengers were shaken but uninjured. The propeller was found in bushland at Revesby four days later.

On 5 May 2019, Aeroflot Flight 1492 from Moscow Sheremetyevo to Murmansk (Russia) with 73 passengers and five crew, was in the initial climb when, following a lightning strike, the crew declared pan-pan reporting they had loss of radio communication first, later emergency via transponder codes and returned to Sheremetyevo for a landing on runway 24L at 18:31L (15:31Z). During the roll out the aircraft burst into flames, veered left off the runway and came to a stop on the grass adjacent to the runway, the aircraft burned down. Forty-one occupants perished in the accident (28 occupants still missing were declared dead), 35 occupants were able to evacuate the aircraft via both front door emergency slides, the two flight crew escaped via the escape ropes through the cockpit windows, there were 11 injuries. The aircraft's tail section completely burned down and was destroyed.

On 10 July 2019, Virgin Australia Flight VA69 from Melbourne to Hong Kong, issued a pan-pan when the pilot realised the right engine was leaking fuel shortly after take off from Melbourne. The pilot advised fire crews to be ready and asked for an emergency landing back at Melbourne. Within 60 minutes of take off the aircraft had landed safely back at Melbourne Tullamarine airport and all crew and passengers were disembarked safely.

On 10 December 2020, UPS Airlines Flight 249 from Dublin to Cologne issued a pan-pan when the Boeing 767's right engine failed shortly after takeoff.  The crew was able to immediately and safely return to Dublin.

On 15 August 2022, the crew of Enter Air flight ENT72UM, performing a flight from Gdansk to Fuerteventura, suffered a number 2 engine malfunction during the climb. Consequently they issued a pan-pan whilst holding nearby Gdansk airport with intent to burn fuel and land there. Due to weather conditions, the crew was redirected and landed safely in Warsaw.

See also
 Distress signal
 NATO phonetic alphabet
 Sécurité
 SOS
 Vessel emergency codes

References

Distress signals
Emergency communication
International telecommunications
Rescue